Metastasis suppressor protein 1 is a protein that in humans is encoded by the MTSS1 gene. True to its name, it codes for a metastasis suppressor.

References

Further reading